Pyrrolidonyl-β-naphthylamide (PYR) is a molecule used in microbiology to detect the presence of pyrrolidonyl peptidase.  In the presence of bacteria with pyrrolidonyl peptidase, it is broken down to pyroglutamic acid and 2-naphthylamine. To detect this process, p-dimethylaminocinnamaldehyde is added and a change to a pink color can then be detected.

References

Carboxamides
Pyrrolidones
Naphthylamines